Hope is a neighborhood on the northern border of Providence, Rhode Island.  To the west, it is bounded by North Main Street, the North Burial Ground, and Interstate 95, while Rochambeau Ave, Hope Street, and the Providence-Pawtucket city line roughly delineate its boundaries to the south, east, and north respectively.  Hope is sometimes referred to as "Summit", named for the street that runs through the middle of the neighborhood.  Though "Hope" is officially recognized, residents and the local neighborhood organization more often use "Summit".

History

The area that is now Hope was first settled in the seventeenth century by farmers and tavernkeepers following present-day North Main Street out of the center of Providence, establishing a strong rural community.

Like many of Providence's neighborhoods, Hope did not experience appreciable development until the area was connected to downtown Providence by streetcar, happening in 1875.  Large farming lots gave way to subdivision and the establishment of single-family homes.  In the 1920s, many of these were bought by a growing community of Russian Jews who would have a strong presence in the area until World War II.

In 1945, Miriam Hospital relocated to Hope from its West End lot.  Having expanded four times since then and opening a new medical building in 1989, the hospital now occupies a full two city blocks, with a parking lot filling out the third, now stretching from 5th Street to 8th Street.

Today, a community organization named the Summit Neighborhood Association publishes a quarterly newspaper and encourages participation in neighborhood activities.

Demographics

As of 1990 Census, the neighborhood was home to 3464 individuals and was roughly 80% non-Hispanic white, 8.2% black, 4% Hispanic, 2% Asian or pacific islander with the remaining 6% either reporting other or multiple races. Median household income was $47,764, above the citywide average of $26,867.  Approximately 5% of families were living below the poverty line, compared with 24% for the city as a whole.

About 40% of housing stock were single-family units, with the remaining being duplex or multi-family units.  The median price for a single-family house was $247,500, nearly twice the citywide average of $130,000.  Owner-occupancy has been steadily dropping, from 56% in 1980 to 48% in 1990.

Disambiguation 
Hope Village Historic District - located in the town of Scituate, RI is served by the US Postal Service as Hope, RI 02831
Hope Valley, Rhode Island - a Census Designated Place located within the town of Hopkinton, RI

References

Provplan.org Neighborhood Profiles
Neighborhood Profiles at providenceri.com
Summit Neighborhood Association

Neighborhoods in Providence, Rhode Island